Anotea is a genus of flowering plants belonging to the family Malvaceae.

Its native range is Southwestern Mexico.

Species:

Anotea flavida

References

Malvaceae
Malvaceae genera